Ludovic Capelle (born 27 February 1976 in Namur) is a Belgian former professional road racing cyclist. He rode the 2001 Tour de France and recorded victories at Scheldeprijs Vlaanderen (2003), Dwars door Vlaanderen (2004) and Grand Prix d'Isbergues (2004).

Major results

1995
 1st Stage 2 Tour de Namur
1996
 1st Ronde van Vlaanderen U23
1997
 1st Kampioenschap van Vlaanderen Gits (Amateurs)
 1st Ronde van Vlaanderen U23
 1st Stage 3 Tour de Liège
1998
 1st Stage 2 Tour de Wallonie
1999
 1st Stage 4 Tour de la Somme
 1st Stage 3 Tour de Wallonie
2000
 1st Tour de la Haute-Sambre
2001
 1st  Road race, National Road Championships
2002
 1st Stage 1 Circuit de la Sarthe
2003
 1st Scheldeprijs Vlaanderen
2004
 1st Dwars door Vlaanderen
 1st Grand Prix d'Isbergues
 1st Stage 5 Tour du Poitou-Charentes

See also
 List of doping cases in cycling

External links

Belgian male cyclists
1976 births
Living people
Doping cases in cycling
Sportspeople from Namur (city)
Cyclists from Namur (province)